The 1911 Lancashire Cup was the seventh year of this regional rugby league competition.  The winners of the trophy, for the first time, were Rochdale Hornets who beat local rivals Oldham in the final at Wheater's Field, Broughton, Salford, by a score of 12-5. The attendance at the final was 20,000 and receipts £630.

Background 
The number of teams entering the competition was increased to 13 with the addition of recent newcomers Coventry. Although not a Lancashire club Coventry and were invited to play to increase the number of games played (the previous year they had played in the Yorkshire Cup on the same basis).

With a total of entrants now at 13, there were only three byes in the first round.

Competition and results

Round 1  
Involved  5 matches (with three byes) and 13 clubs

Round 2 – quarterfinals

Round 3 – semifinals

Final

Teams and scorers 

Scoring - Try = three (3) points - Goal = two (2) points - Drop goal = two (2) points

The road to success

Notes and comments 
1 Wheater's Field was the home ground of Broughton Rangers with a capacity of 20,000

See also 
1911–12 Northern Rugby Football Union season

References

RFL Lancashire Cup
Lancashire Cup